The Butler Block is an historic mixed use residential and commercial building located at 166 Linwood Street, in Uxbridge, Massachusetts.  This  brick and wood building was built c. 1845–55.  Most of the building's walls are made of brick laid in common bond, but the upper level of the north facade is framed in wood.  The property also includes a 19th-century barn.  The building has relatively simple Greek Revival styling, including corners trimmed with pilasters.

On October 7, 1983, it was added to the National Register of Historic Places, where it is listed at 210 Linwood.

See also
 National Register of Historic Places listings in Uxbridge, Massachusetts

References

Commercial blocks on the National Register of Historic Places in Massachusetts
Buildings and structures in Uxbridge, Massachusetts
National Register of Historic Places in Uxbridge, Massachusetts